Toa Domestic Airlines Flight 63, registration JA8764, was a NAMC YS-11A-217 en route from Okadama Airport in Sapporo, Japan to Hakodate Airport. On July 3, 1971, the plane left Sapporo Okadama Airport on a scheduled flight at 08:30. After arriving in Hakodate airspace, the plane was descending below 1800 metres when it crashed at 09:05 into the south face of Yokotsudake  (Yokotsu Mountain). All 64 passengers and four crew on board are killed in the scene. The cause of the crash was determined to be pilot error that followed strong winds pushing the plane off course which leads to CFIT.

The Aircraft Accident Investigation Commission (AAIC) was formed soon after the crash.

References

External links

 

Video of the crash site from Associated Press Archive

Aviation accidents and incidents in 1971
Aviation accidents and incidents in Japan
Accidents and incidents involving the NAMC YS-11
Toa Airways accidents and incidents
1971 in Japan
July 1971 events in Asia